The 1984 South African motorcycle Grand Prix was the first round of the 1984 Grand Prix motorcycle racing season. It took place on the weekend of 22–24 March 1984 at the Kyalami circuit.

Classification

500 cc

References

South African motorcycle Grand Prix
Motorcycle
March 1984 sports events in Africa